{{Automatic taxobox
| image = Ptyodactylus puiseuxi02.jpg
| image_caption = Ptyodactylus puiseuxi
| taxon = Ptyodactylus
| authority = Goldfuss, 1820<ref>Goldfuss GA (1820). "Reptilia". In: Schubert GH (editor) (1820). Handbuch der Naturgeschichte zum Gebrauch bei Vorlesungen, Handbuch der Zoologie, vol. 3. Nürnberg: J.L. Schrag. pp. 121–181.</ref>
|subdivision_ranks = Species
|subdivision = 12, see text.
}}Ptyodactylus is a genus of geckos, which are commonly known as fan-fingered geckos.
The genus has 12 described species.

Geographic range and habitat
The genus Ptyodactylus is distributed across dry areas of Africa and the Middle East.

Description
The common name, fan-fingered geckos, is derived from the pattern of the straight toes which are splayed out like the pattern of a snowflake. The pads on the ventral surface of the toes are adhesive, and each toe has a retractable claw.

Species & subspecies
The following species and subspecies are recognized as being valid.

Ptyodactylus ananjevae 
Ptyodactylus dhofarensis 
Ptyodactylus guttatus  – Sinai fan-fingered gecko 
Ptyodactylus hasselquistii  – yellow fan-fingered gecko 
Ptyodactylus hasselquistii hasselquistii 
Ptyodactylus hasselquistii krameri  – Kramer's yellow fan-fingered gecko
Ptyodactylus homolepis  – Pakistan fan-fingered gecko
Ptyodactylus orlovi 
Ptyodactylus oudrii  – Algerian fan-fingered gecko
Ptyodactylus puiseuxi  – Israeli fan-fingered gecko 
Ptyodactylus ragazzii  – Ragazzi's fan-footed gecko
Ptyodactylus rivapadiali  – Riva and Padial's fan-footed gecko
Ptyodactylus ruusaljibalicus  – Ruus al Jibal fan-footed gecko 
Ptyodactylus togoensis  – Togo fan-footed gecko

References

Further reading
Oken L (1817). Isis oder Encyclopadische Zeitung von Oken. Erster Band [Volume One]. Jena: Expedition der Isis. 1,576 pp. + 12 plates. (Ptyodactylus, new genus, p. 1183). (in German).

 
Lizard genera
Taxa named by Lorenz Oken